Gemma Doyle may refer to:

Gemma Doyle (politician), UK Labour Party politician and former MP
The Gemma Doyle Trilogy, a trilogy of fantasy novels by Libba Bray
Gemma Doyle (character), the central character in the trilogy